"Come On" is a song written and first released by Chuck Berry in 1961. It has been recorded in many versions by many bands since its release, most notably the Rolling Stones. "Come On" failed to chart in the US Top 100, but the B-side, "Go Go Go", reached number 38 on the UK Singles Chart.

Personnel
According to the liner notes from the Berry compilation album The Great Twenty-Eight, the performers on the record were as follows:
Chuck Berrylead vocals, guitar
Johnnie Johnsonpiano
Ebby Hardingdrums
L.C. Davistenor saxophone
Martha Berrybackground vocals

The Rolling Stones version

"Come On" was chosen as the Rolling Stones' debut single. Released in June 1963, it reached number 21 on the UK single charts. The B-side was the Stones' arrangement of Willie Dixon's "I Want to Be Loved". Both songs were recorded on May 10, 1963. Other songs recorded on that day were "Love Potion No. 9" (unverified) and "Pretty Thing". "Come On" has been released on several compilation albums: More Hot Rocks (Big Hits & Fazed Cookies) (1972), Singles Collection: The London Years (1989) (together with its B-side), Singles 1963-1965 (2004) (together with its B-side), Rolled Gold+: The Very Best of the Rolling Stones (2007), GRRR! (2012) and Stray Cats, a bonus disc available only on the Rolling Stones In Mono Box Set (together with its B-side).

During the 6 June 2013 concert in Toronto, Canada, as part of the 50 & Counting Tour, Mick Jagger sang a few bars (with Charlie Watts drumming the beat) after mentioning the single being released exactly 50 years ago, the day after that night. It was the first time the song was heard in any capacity during a Rolling Stones concert since 1965.

Personnel
Mick Jaggerlead vocals
Keith Richards guitar
Brian Jones harmonica, backing vocals
Bill Wymanbass guitar, backing vocals
Charlie Watts drums
Technical
Roger Savage - sound engineer

References

1961 singles
Chess Records singles
Chuck Berry songs
1963 debut singles
The Rolling Stones songs
Decca Records singles
Rock ballads
Songs written by Chuck Berry
Song recordings produced by Andrew Loog Oldham
1961 songs